is a Japanese table tennis player. In 2016, he won the world junior singles and team title at the 2016 World Junior Table Tennis Championships for Japan.

In August 2017, he became the youngest ever winner of an ITTF World Tour men's singles title, winning the Czech Open title at the age of 14 years and 61 days. In December 2018, he became the youngest player to win the ITTF World Tour Grand Finals at the age of 15 years and 172 days.

Personal life
Harimoto was born as Zhang Zhihe in Sendai in Miyagi Prefecture. His father Zhang Yu and mother Zhang Ling are both former professional table tennis players from Sichuan province, China. Zhang Ling, at the peak of her career, represented China at the 43rd World Table Tennis Championships in Tianjin. His younger sister  is also a table tennis player competing in the U-18 junior table tennis circuit.

Harimoto began playing table tennis at the age of two. He became a naturalized citizen of Japan in 2014 and legally changed his surname to Harimoto. After graduating from East Miyagi Elementary School in 2016, he relocated to Tokyo to join the JOC Elite Academy. His pastimes include baseball and reading. 

In April 2022, Harimoto announced he will be attending Waseda University School of Human Sciences after graduating from Nihon University Senior High School.

Career

Junior career
Harimoto first won the All-Japan Table Tennis Championships Juniors title in 2010 as a first grader.  He would continue to win the tournament for all 6 years of his elementary school years.  In 2015, he was chosen to represent Japan at the World Junior Table Tennis Championships in France, becoming the youngest Japanese player to be chosen.  However, due to the November 2015 Paris attacks, Harimoto was not able to participate in the tournament.

Aged 12 years and 355 days, Harimoto defeated seasoned professionals Ho Kwan Kit, Hugo Calderano, and teammate Kohei Sambe to win the 2016 U-21 Japan Open title. With the win, he became the youngest winner ITTF World Tour under-21 men's singles title. Later that year, Harimoto won gold medals in the boys' singles and teams events at the World Junior Table Tennis Championships in Cape Town, South Africa. This win was historic, as Harimoto became the youngest winner of the World Junior Championships aged 13 years and 163 days. Harimoto achieved an Under-21 ranking of No. 10 in the world in December 2016.

2017
Harimoto began the year in February at the recently revamped India Open. He reached the finals with victories over Álvaro Robles, Sakai Asuka, Robert Gardos, and local favorite Sharath Kamal, before losing to defending champion Dimitrij Ovtcharov in straight sets.

2018
In June of 2018, Harimoto shocked the world by winning first place in the ITTF World Tour Japan Open, after beating Olympic champions Ma Long in the semifinal and Zhang Jike in the final. He was just short of 15 years old when he won the title. Later in the year, Harimoto continued to win the ITTF World Tour Grand Finals in Incheon, South Korea, where he defeated Lin Gaoyuan 4-1 in the final and became the youngest-ever winner of the event. His outstanding performance in 2018 also helped him reach No.3 in the ITTF world ranking, his career best.

2020
Harimoto won third place at the 2020 World Cup. Harimoto led 3–1 against Ma Long in the semi-finals, but lost 4–3 after Ma Long called time-out in the fifth game and switched to a high-toss serve that Harimoto had trouble reading.

2021
In March, Harimoto played in WTT Doha. He was upset in the semi-finals by Dimitrij Ovtcharov in the WTT Contender event, but won the champion for the WTT Star Contender event.

In June, teammate Jun Mizutani said that Harimoto's mental game was steadily improving in 2021 and better than the previous year. Mizutani also positively noted that Harimoto was reverting to his more aggressive style of play in 2021.

Harimoto was upset by Darko Jorgic in the round of 16 of the men's singles event at the Tokyo Olympics. Originally slated to be the ace player in the team event, Harimoto ended up playing in doubles in Japan's 3–1 victory against Sweden in the quarter-finals. In the semi-finals, Harimoto won both his matches as the ace player against Germany, but Germany still won 3–2.

Records
June 2016: Youngest ever winner of an ITTF World Tour under-21 men's singles title (12 years, 355 days).
December 2016: Youngest ever winner of the boys' singles title at the World Junior Championships (13 years, 163 days).
August 2017: Youngest ever winner of an ITTF World Tour men's singles title (14 years, 61 days).
January 2018: Youngest ever winner of the men's singles title at the Japanese National Championships (14 years, 207 days).
December 2018: Youngest ever winner of an ITTF World Tour Grand Finals men's singles title (15 years, 172 days).

Awards
ITTF Star Awards: Breakthrough Star (2017)

Major tournament performance timeline

(W) won; (F) finalist; (SF) semi-finalist; (QF) quarter-finalist; (#R) rounds 4, 3, 2, 1;(S) singles event; (MD) men's doubles event; (XD) mixed doubles event; (T) team event.

Senior career highlights, as of November 2022

ITTF/WTT career finals

Singles finals: 13 (8 titles, 5 runner-ups)

Men's doubles finals: 3 (1 title, 2 runner-ups)

Mixed doubles finals: 6 (3 titles, 3 runner-ups)

Record against top-10 players
Harimoto's singles match record against those who have been ranked in the top 10, with those who have been No. 1 in bold:

Statistics correct . * indicates current world rank no. 1.

References

External links

Japanese male table tennis players
2003 births
Sportspeople from Sendai
Living people
Japanese sportspeople of Chinese descent
People who lost Chinese citizenship
Table tennis players at the 2018 Summer Youth Olympics
Kinoshita Meister Tokyo players
Olympic table tennis players of Japan
Table tennis players at the 2020 Summer Olympics
Olympic medalists in table tennis
Olympic bronze medalists for Japan
Medalists at the 2020 Summer Olympics
World Table Tennis Championships medalists